The 2008–09 Wisconsin Badgers men's ice hockey team was the Badgers' 56th season. They represent the University of Wisconsin–Madison in the 2008–09 NCAA Division I men's ice hockey season. The team is coached by Mike Eaves and play their home games at Kohl Center.

Regular season

Standings

Schedule and results
 Green background indicates win (2 points).
 Red background indicates loss (0 points).
 White background indicates tie (1 point).

Player stats

Skaters
Note: GP = Games played; G = Goals; A = Assists; Pts = Points; +/- = Plus/minus; PIM = Penalty minutes

Goaltenders
Note: GP = Games played; TOI = Time on ice; W = Wins; L = Losses; T = Ties; GA = Goals against; SO = Shutouts; SV% = Save percentage; GAA = Goals against average; G = Goals; A = Assists; PIM = Penalty minutes

See also
2008–09 Wisconsin Badgers women's ice hockey season

External links
Wisconsin Badgers men's ice hockey

Wisconsin
Wisconsin Badgers men's ice hockey seasons
W
Wiscon
Wiscon